The 1977–78 QMJHL season was the ninth season in the history of the Quebec Major Junior Hockey League. The league inaugurates two awards, the Robert Lebel Trophy for the team with best goals against average, and the Guy Lafleur Trophy for the Most Valuable Player of the playoffs. Ten teams played 72 games each in the schedule. The Trois-Rivières Draveurs finished first overall in the regular season winning the Jean Rougeau Trophy, and won the President's Cup defeating the Montreal Juniors in the finals.

Team changes
 The Sorel Éperviers relocate to Verdun, Quebec, and switch to the Lebel Division.
 The Sherbrooke Castors switch to the Dilio Division.

Final standings
Note: GP = Games played; W = Wins; L = Losses; T = Ties; PTS = Points; GF = Goals for; GA = Goals against

complete list of standings.

Scoring leaders
Note: GP = Games played; G = Goals; A = Assists; Pts = Points; PIM = Penalties in minutes

 complete scoring statistics

Playoffs
Richard David was the leading scorer of the playoffs with 33 points (17 goals, 16 assists).

Quarterfinals
 Trois-Rivières Draveurs defeated Quebec Remparts 4 games to 0.
 Cornwall Royals defeated Hull Olympiques 4 games to 0.
 Montreal Juniors defeated Verdun Éperviers 4 games to 0.
 Sherbrooke Castors defeated Laval National 4 games to 0, 1 tie.

Semifinals
 Trois-Rivières Draveurs defeated Sherbrooke Castors 4 games to 1.
 Montreal Juniors defeated Cornwall Royals 4 games to 1.

Finals
 Trois-Rivières Draveurs defeated Montreal Juniors 4 games to 0.

All-star teams
First team
 Goaltender - Jacques Cloutier, Trois-Rivières Draveurs 
 Left defence - Mark Hardy, Montreal Juniors
 Right defence - Ray Bourque, Verdun Éperviers
 Left winger - Patrick Daley, Laval National
 Centreman - Kevin Reeves, Montreal Juniors
 Right winger - Ron Carter, Sherbrooke Castors 
 Coach - Michel Bergeron, Trois-Rivières Draveurs
Second team
 Goaltender - Marco Baron, Montreal Juniors 
 Left defence - Kevin Lowe, Quebec Remparts
 Right defence - Graeme Nicolson, Cornwall Royals 
 Left winger - Michel Goulet, Quebec Remparts 
 Centreman - Glen Currie, Laval National
 Right winger - Daniel Metivier, Hull Olympiques
 Coach - Orval Tessier, Cornwall Royals
 List of First/Second/Rookie team all-stars.

Trophies and awards
Team
President's Cup - Playoff Champions, Trois-Rivières Draveurs
Jean Rougeau Trophy - Regular Season Champions, Trois-Rivières Draveurs
Robert Lebel Trophy - Team with best GAA, Trois-Rivières Draveurs

Player
Michel Brière Memorial Trophy - Most Valuable Player, Kevin Reeves, Montreal Juniors
Jean Béliveau Trophy - Top Scorer, Ron Carter, Sherbrooke Castors
Guy Lafleur Trophy - Playoff MVP, Richard David, Trois-Rivières Draveurs
Jacques Plante Memorial Trophy - Best GAA, Tim Bernhardt, Cornwall Royals
Emile Bouchard Trophy - Defenceman of the Year, Mark Hardy, Montreal Juniors
Michel Bergeron Trophy - Rookie of the Year, Denis Savard, Montreal Juniors and Normand Rochefort, Trois-Rivières Draveurs 
Frank J. Selke Memorial Trophy - Most sportsmanlike player, Kevin Reeves, Montreal Juniors

See also
1978 Memorial Cup
1978 NHL Entry Draft
1977–78 OMJHL season
1977–78 WCHL season

References
 Official QMJHL Website
 www.hockeydb.com/

Quebec Major Junior Hockey League seasons
QMJHL